The South Indian flying barb (Esomus barbatus) is a species of cyprinid endemic to India where it is found in drainages in the Eastern Ghats and Western Ghats. It is sometimes considered conspecific with Esomus thermoicos.

References

Freshwater fish of India
Fish described in 1849
Esomus